Catch Me If You Can is a 2002 American biographical crime comedy-drama film directed and produced by Steven Spielberg and starring Leonardo DiCaprio and Tom Hanks with Christopher Walken, Martin Sheen, Nathalie Baye, Amy Adams and James Brolin in supporting roles. The screenplay by Jeff Nathanson is based on the semi-autobiographical book of the same name of Frank Abagnale, who claims that before his 19th birthday, he successfully performed cons worth millions of dollars by posing as a Pan American World Airways pilot, a Georgia doctor, and a Louisiana parish prosecutor. The truth of his story is questionable.

A movie version of Abagnale's book of the same name was contemplated soon after it was published in 1980 but began in earnest in 1997 when Spielberg's DreamWorks bought the film rights. David Fincher, Gore Verbinski, Lasse Hallström, Miloš Forman, and Cameron Crowe were all considered to direct the film before Spielberg decided to direct it himself. Filming took place from February to May 2002.

The film opened on December 25, 2002, to critical and commercial success. At the 75th Academy Awards, Christopher Walken and John Williams were nominated for Best Supporting Actor and Best Original Score, respectively.

Plot

In 1963, Frank William Abagnale Jr. lives in New Rochelle, New York with his father Frank Abagnale Sr. and his French mother Paula. During his youth, he witnesses his father's many techniques for conning people. Because of Frank Sr.'s tax problems with the IRS, the family is forced to move to a small apartment.

One day, Frank discovers that his mother is having an affair with his father's friend Jack Barnes at the Rotary Club of New Rochelle. When his parents divorce, Frank runs away. Needing money, he turns to confidence scams to survive and his cons grow bolder. He impersonates a Pan Am pilot named Frank Taylor and forges the airline's payroll checks. Soon, his forgeries are worth millions of dollars.

News of the crimes reaches the Federal Bureau of Investigation (FBI), and Agent Carl Hanratty begins tracking Frank. Carl finds him at a hotel, but Frank tricks Carl into believing he is a Secret Service agent named Barry Allen. He escapes before Carl realizes that he was fooled.

Frank begins to impersonate a doctor. As Dr. Frank Conners, he falls in love with Brenda, a naive young hospital nurse. He asks her attorney father for her hand in marriage and also for help with arranging to take the Louisiana State Bar exam, which Frank passes. Carl tracks Frank to his and Brenda's engagement party, but Frank escapes through a bedroom window, telling Brenda to meet him at Miami International Airport two days later. 

At the airport, Frank spots Brenda, but also plainclothes agents. He realizes she has given him up, then drives away. Re-assuming his pilot identity, he stages a false recruiting drive for stewardesses at a local college. Surrounded by eight women as stewardesses, he conceals himself from Carl and the other agents at the airport and escapes on a flight to Madrid, Spain.

In 1967, Carl tracks down Frank in his mother's hometown of Montrichard, France and manages to trick him into being arrested. He is incarcerated in a French prison in Marseille where he becomes very ill due to its poor conditions. Carl takes Frank on a flight back to the United States. As they approach, Carl informs him that his father has died. Grief-stricken, Frank escapes from the plane and reaches the house of his mother who now has a daughter with Barnes. Frank surrenders to Carl and is sentenced to 12 years in a maximum-security prison.

Carl occasionally visits Frank. During one visit, he shows him a fraud check from a case he is working on. Frank immediately figures out that the bank teller was involved in the fraud. Impressed, Carl convinces the FBI to allow him to serve the remainder of his sentence working for the FBI Financial Crimes Unit. Frank agrees but soon grows restless about the tedious office work.

One weekend, Frank prepares to impersonate a pilot again and is intercepted by Carl, who is willing to let him continue with his con, assuring him that no one is chasing him and that it's his choice.  Frank returns to work and discusses another fraud case with Carl, who questions him about how he cheated at the Louisiana Star Bar exam but Frank reveals that he studied and passed it, which makes Carl smile.

A postscript states that Frank lived for 26 years in the Midwestern United States with his wife, with whom he has had three sons, remains friends with Carl, and has built a successful living as one of the world's leading experts on bank fraud and forgery.

Cast

 Leonardo DiCaprio as Frank Abagnale, a teenager who turned into a con artist and later the FBI’s Bank Fraud Consultant in the Financial Crimes Unit.
 Tom Hanks as Carl Hanratty, an FBI Agent who is based on Joseph Shea.
 Christopher Walken as Frank Abagnale Sr., the father of Frank Abagnale.
 Martin Sheen as Roger Strong, an attorney.
 Nathalie Baye as Paula Abagnale, the French mother of Frank.
 Amy Adams as Brenda Strong, a young hospital worker ("candy striper") and the daughter of Roger.
 James Brolin as Jack Barnes, the friend of Frank Abagnale Sr. who had an affair with Paula.
 Nancy Lenehan as Carol Strong, the mother of Brenda.
 Candice Azzara as Darcy
 Malachi Throne as Abe Penner, a check printer who helps Carl trace Frank to Montrichard.
 Alfred Dennis as Ira Penner, the brother of Abe and a check printer who helps Carl trace Frank to Montrichard.
 Amy Acker as Miggy Acker, one of the eight women that Frank recruits to be his stewardesses.
 Guy Thauvette as Warden Garren, the prison warden of the unnamed Marseille prison.
 Maggie Mellin as the unnamed French teacher who Frank impersonates.
 Thomas Kopache as Principal Evans, the principal of Frank's school who busts him for impersonating a substitute teacher.
 James Morrison as Pilot
 Robert Symonds as Mr. Rosen
 Dave Hager as Judge
 Jasmine Jessica Anthony as the unnamed daughter of Paula and Jack

Brian Howe, Frank John Hughes and Chris Ellis portray FBI agents Earl Amdursky, Tom Fox, and Special Agent Witkins respectively. John Finn portrays FBI Assistant Director Marsh. Jennifer Garner cameos as a call girl named Cheryl Ann. Ellen Pompeo, Elizabeth Banks, and Kaitlin Doubleday have supporting roles as Marci, Lucy, and Joanna. The real Frank Abagnale appears in a cameo as a French police officer arresting his onscreen counterpart.

Production

Development
Frank Abagnale sold the film rights to his autobiography in 1980. According to Abagnale, producers Norman Lear and Bud Yorkin purchased the film rights after seeing him on The Tonight Show with Johnny Carson. Two years later, they sold the rights to Columbia Pictures, who in turn sold the rights to producer Hall Bartlett. Bartlett and business partner Michael J. Lasky hired Steven Kunes to write the screenplay, but Bartlett died before the project found a distributor. The rights were then sold to Hollywood Pictures, a division of Disney, and when the project went into turnaround, the rights were again sold to Bungalow 78 Productions, a division of TriStar Pictures. From there, the project was presented to Steven Spielberg at DreamWorks Pictures. According to Daily Variety, executive producer Michel Shane purchased the film rights in 1990 for Paramount Pictures. By December 1997, Barry Kemp purchased the film rights from Shane, bringing the project to DreamWorks, with Jeff Nathanson writing the script. By April 2000, David Fincher was attached to direct over the course of a few months, but dropped out in favor of Panic Room. In July 2000, Leonardo DiCaprio had entered discussions to star, with Gore Verbinski to direct. Spielberg signed on as producer, and filming was set to begin in March 2001.

Casting
Verbinski cast James Gandolfini as Carl Hanratty, Ed Harris as Frank Abagnale Sr. and Chloë Sevigny as Brenda Strong. Verbinski dropped out because of DiCaprio's commitment on Gangs of New York. Lasse Hallström was in negotiations to direct by May 2001, but dropped out in July 2001. At this stage, Harris and Sevigny left the film, but Gandolfini was still attached. Spielberg, co-founder of DreamWorks, offered the job of director to Miloš Forman, and considered hiring Cameron Crowe. During this negotiation period, Spielberg began to consider directing the film himself, eventually dropping projects such as Big Fish and Memoirs of a Geisha. Spielberg officially committed to directing in August 2001. That same month, Tom Hanks was cast to replace Gandolfini, who had exited due to scheduling conflicts with The Sopranos.

The search for Sevigny's replacement as Brenda Strong lasted months, but Amy Adams was eventually cast. Spielberg "loved" her tape, and producer Walter F. Parkes commented that she was "as fresh and honest as anyone we'd seen," which was an important element in the role. Christopher Walken was cast as Frank Abagnale Sr. following Parkes' suggestion. Martin Sheen played Roger Strong, as he had "intimidating presence". Spielberg wanted a French actress to portray Paula Abagnale to stay true to the facts. He asked for the help of Brian De Palma, who was living in Paris, and he did tests with several actresses such as Nathalie Baye. Spielberg had seen Jennifer Garner on Alias and offered her a small role in the film.

Filming
Filming was scheduled to begin in January 2002, but was pushed to February 7 in Los Angeles, California. Locations included Burbank, Downey, New York City, LA/Ontario International Airport (which doubled for Miami International Airport), Quebec City and Montreal. The film was shot in 147 locations in only 52 days. DiCaprio reflected, "Scenes that we thought would take three days took an afternoon." Filming ran from April 25–30 on Park Avenue, just outside the Waldorf-Astoria Hotel. Production moved to Orange, New Jersey and returned to Brooklyn for bank and courthouse scenes. Shooting also took place at the TWA Flight Center at John F. Kennedy International Airport. Quebec City was chosen for its European character and French feel. Place Royale, within Old Quebec, stands in for Montrichard, and the church in the background of the arrest scene is Notre-Dame-des-Victoires. Filming ended on May 12 in Montreal.

Music

The film's soundtrack was released on December 10, 2002 by DreamWorks Records. The original score was composed and conducted by John Williams.

Historical accuracy
Abagnale had little involvement with the film, but believed Spielberg was the only filmmaker who "could do this film justice," despite the various changes from real-life events. In November 2001, Abagnale said:
I am not a consultant on the film. I've never met nor spoken to Steven Spielberg and I have not read the script. I prefer not to. I understand that they now portray my father in a better light, as he really was. Steven Spielberg has told the screenplay writer (Jeff Nathanson) that he wants complete accuracy in the relationships and actual scams that I perpetrated. I hope in the end the movie will be entertaining, exciting, funny and bring home an important message about family, childhood and divorce.
The real Abagnale never saw his father again after he ran away from home, but Spielberg "wanted to continue to have that connection where Frank kept trying to please his father; by making him proud of him; by seeing him in the uniform, the Pan-American uniform."

In a presentation for "Talks at Google" in November 2017, Abagnale commented extensively about the accuracy of Spielberg's film:
I've only seen the movie twice. So when the media asked me what I thought about the movie, and what was right and what was wrong, I said: First of all I have two brothers and a sister; he portrayed me as an only child. In real life, my mother never remarried; there's a scene in the movie where she's remarried, and has a little girl. That didn't really happen. In real life I never saw my father after I ran away; in the movie they keep having him come back to Christopher Walken in the film. That didn't really happen. ... I escaped off the aircraft through the kitchen galley where they bring the food and stuff onto the plane; and there they had me escape through the toilet. ... I thought he stayed very close to the story, but pretty much all of that. He was very concerned about being accurate, first of all because it was the first time he made a movie about a real person living. Second the Bureau had an information officer on the set for all the shooting of the entire film to make sure that what he said about the FBI ... was accurate. ... And then of course, as he later said, 'I really got most of my information from those three retired agents.' ... So I thought he did a good job of staying very, very accurate at the movie.
In addition, the real name of the actual FBI agent who Abagnale alleges tracked and later worked with him was Joseph Shea; Abagnale has stated that because Shea did not want his name to be used in the film, the character was renamed as Carl and given the surname Hanratty, based on a football player of the same name.

Despite his claim that Spielberg "stayed very close to the story", records show Abagnale was in the Great Meadow Prison in Comstock, New York between the ages of 17 and 20 (July 26, 1965 to Dec 24, 1968, inmate #25367), and before that, he was in the United States Navy (December 1964 to February 1965). Six weeks after his release from Great Meadow, on February 14, 1969, he was re-arrested in Baton Rouge, Louisiana. He was jailed locally, and in June 1969, he was convicted of stealing from a local family and small business in Baton Rouge. Abagnale did dress as a Pan American Airlines pilot for a brief period in the fall of 1970. He was arrested in Cobb County, Georgia on November 2, 1970. Federal court records associated with his conviction show he cashed only 10 personal checks dressed up with a Pan American Airlines logo, totalling less than $1,500 USD. The facts behind many of Abagnale's exaggerated claims, and their inclusion or omission from the film, have been the subject of renewed media reporting in 2021. His claim that he passed the Louisiana bar exam and worked for Attorney General Jack P. F. Gremillion was debunked by several journalists in 1978. Journalist Ira Perry was unable to find any evidence that Abagnale worked with the FBI; according to one retired FBI Special agent in charge, Abagnale was caught trying to pass personal checks in 1978 several years after he claimed that he began working with the FBI.

Themes
Catch Me if You Can deals with themes of broken homes and troubled childhoods. Spielberg's parents divorced when he was a teenager, similar to Frank Abagnale's situation. In the film, Carl Hanratty is also divorced from his wife, who lives with their daughter in Chicago. "Some of my films have had to do with broken homes and people on the run from their sad pasts," Spielberg stated. But there are those strands that got me to say: you know, there's something also about me that I can say through the telling of this kind of lighthearted story.Spielberg also wanted to create a film that sympathized with a crook. He explained, Frank was a 21st-century genius working within the innocence of the mid '60s, when people were more trusting than they are now. I don't think this is the kind of movie where somebody could say, 'I have a career plan.'

Release

DreamWorks was careful to market the film as "inspired by a true story" to avoid controversy similar to that surrounding A Beautiful Mind (2001) and The Hurricane (1999), both of which deviated from history. The premiere took place at Westwood, Los Angeles, California, on December 18, 2002.

Game Show Network has aired the 1977 episode of the television game show To Tell the Truth that featured Frank Abagnale. Segments were shown on December 29, 2002, and January 1, 2003, as promotion.

Home media
Catch Me If You Can was released on DVD and VHS on May 6, 2003. It included special features including never-before-seen footage by director Steven Spielberg as well as interviews. A Blu-ray version was released on December 4, 2012.

Reception

Box office
Catch Me If You Can was released on December 25, 2002, earning slightly above $30 million in 3,225 theaters during its opening weekend, in second place behind The Lord of the Rings: The Two Towers. The film went on to gross $164.6 million in North America and $187.5 million in foreign countries, with a worldwide total of $352.1 million. The film was a financial success, recouping the $52 million budget seven times over. Catch Me If You Can was the eleventh highest-grossing film of 2002; Minority Report, also a Spielberg film, was the tenth highest.

Critical response
On Rotten Tomatoes, Catch Me If You Can has a "certified fresh" rating of 96% based on 203 reviews, with an average rating of 7.9/10. The site's critical consensus reads: "With help from a strong performance by Leonardo DiCaprio as real-life wunderkind con artist Frank Abagnale, Steven Spielberg crafts a film that's stylish, breezily entertaining, and surprisingly sweet." On Metacritic, the film has a score of 75 out of 100, based on 39 critics, indicating "generally favorable reviews". Audiences polled by CinemaScore gave the film an average grade of "A-" on an A+ to F scale.

Roger Ebert heavily praised DiCaprio's performance, and concluded "This is not a major Spielberg film, although it is an effortlessly watchable one." Mick LaSalle said it was "not Spielberg's best movie, but one of his smoothest and maybe his friendliest. The colorful cinematography, smart performances and brisk tempo suggest a filmmaker subordinating every other impulse to the task of manufacturing pleasure." Stephen Hunter believed DiCaprio shows "the range and ease and cleverness that Martin Scorsese so underutilized in Gangs of New York."

James Berardinelli observed, "Catch Me if You Can never takes itself or its subjects too seriously, and contains more genuinely funny material than about 90% of the so-called 'comedies' found in multiplexes these days." Berardinelli praised John Williams' film score, which he felt was "more intimate and jazzy than his usual material, evoking (intentionally) Henry Mancini." Peter Travers was one of few who gave the film a negative review; he considered the film to be "bogged down over 140 minutes. A film that took off like a hare on speed ends like a winded tortoise."

Accolades
At the 75th Academy Awards, Christopher Walken and John Williams were nominated for Best Supporting Actor and Best Original Score. Walken won the same category at the 56th British Academy Film Awards, while Williams, costume designer Mary Zophres and screenwriter Jeff Nathanson received nominations. DiCaprio was nominated for the Golden Globe Award for Best Actor in a Motion Picture – Drama. Williams also earned a Grammy Award nomination. Elements of the film were later parodied in The Simpsons episode "Catch 'Em If You Can".

Musical adaptation

A musical adaptation of the same name premiered at the 5th Avenue Theatre in Seattle, Washington in July 2009, starring Aaron Tveit and Norbert Leo Butz. It began previews on Broadway at the Neil Simon Theatre on March 11, 2011 and officially opened April 10, 2011. The musical was nominated for four Tony Awards, including Best Musical.

See also
 The Great Impostor, a 1961 film based on the story of an impostor named Ferdinand Waldo Demara
 The Pretender, a TV series
 VIPs, a 2010 film based on the story of Brazilian businessman, consultant, speaker, and former embezzler, Marcelo Nascimento Rocha

References

 Frank Abagnale Jr. and Stan Redding. Catch Me If You Can: The Amazing True Story of the Youngest and Most Daring Con Man in the History of Fun and Profit..

External links

 
 
 
 
 
 
 
 An Interview with Leonardo DiCaprio - Movies Feature at IGN

2002 films
2000s English-language films
2000s biographical films
2000s chase films
2000s crime films
American biographical films
American chase films
American crime films
BAFTA winners (films)
Biographical films about fraudsters
Crime films based on actual events
Cultural depictions of American men
Cultural depictions of fraudsters
Amblin Entertainment films
DreamWorks Pictures films
Films about con artists
Films about fraud
Films adapted into plays
Films based on autobiographies
Films directed by Steven Spielberg
Films produced by Steven Spielberg
Films scored by John Williams
Films set in Atlanta
Films set in California
Films set in Florida
Films set in France
Films set in Louisiana
Films set in New York City
Films set in Westchester County, New York
Films set in the 1960s
Films shot in California
Films shot in Montreal
Films shot in New Jersey
Films shot in New York City
Films with screenplays by Jeff Nathanson
Films produced by Walter F. Parkes
Films about father–son relationships
Films set in a movie theatre
2000s American films